This is a list of Royal Australian Navy Fleet Air Arm flying squadrons. The Fleet Air Arm was founded in 1947. Since then the Royal Australian Navy has formed a number of squadrons which have operated a range of fixed-wing aircraft and helicopters from aircraft carriers, other warships, and shore establishments.

Squadrons
723 Squadron RAN - Currently active
Royal Australian Navy Helicopter Flight Vietnam
724 Squadron RAN 
725 Squadron RAN - Currently active
805 Squadron RAN
808 Squadron RAN - Currently active
816 Squadron RAN - Currently active
817 Squadron RAN
822X Squadron RAN - Currently active 
850 Squadron RAN
851 Squadron RAN

See also
List of Royal Australian Air Force aircraft squadrons
List of Australian Army aviation units

Notes

References
 

Air
Australian Fleet Air Arm flying squadrons